The Hoogovens Wijk aan Zee Steel Chess Tournament 1986 was the 48th edition of the Wijk aan Zee Chess Tournament. It was held in Wijk aan Zee in January 1986. The tournament was won by Nigel Short.

{| class="wikitable" style="text-align: center;"
|+ 48th Hoogovens tournament, group A, 17 January – 2 February 1986, Wijk aan Zee, Netherlands, Category XII (2539)
! !! Player !! Rating !! 1 !! 2 !! 3 !! 4 !! 5 !! 6 !! 7 !! 8 !! 9 !! 10 !! 11 !! 12 !! 13 !! 14 !! Total !! TPR !! Place
|-
|-style="background:#ccffcc;"
| 1 || align="left"| || 2585 ||  || ½ || ½ || ½ || 1 || ½ || 1 || ½ || ½ || ½ || 1 || 1 || 1 || 1 || 9½ || 2710 || 1
|-
| 2 || align="left"| || 2555 || ½ ||  || 0 || 1 || ½ || ½ || 1 || ½ || ½ || ½ || ½ || 1 || 1 || ½ || 8 || 2624 || 2–4
|-
| 3 || align="left" | || 2605 || ½ || 1 ||  || ½ || ½ || ½ || ½ || ½ || 0 || ½ || 1 || 1 || ½ || 1 || 8 || 2620 || 2–4
|-
| 4 || align="left" | || 2565 || ½ || 0 || ½ ||  || ½ || 1 || 0 || ½ || 1 || ½ || ½ || 1 || 1 || 1 || 8 || 2624 || 2–4
|-
| 5 || align="left" | || 2625 || 0 || ½ || ½ || ½ ||  || ½ || ½ || ½ || ½ || ½ || 1 || 1 || ½ || 1 || 7½ || 2589 || 5
|-
| 6 || align="left" | || 2480 || ½ || ½ || ½ || 0 || ½ ||  || 0 || ½ || 1 || 1 || ½ || 0 || 1 || 1 || 7 || 2572 || 6–7
|-
| 7 || align="left" | || 2525 || 0 || 0 || ½ || 1 || ½ || 1 ||  || ½ || ½ || ½ || ½ || ½ || ½ || 1 || 7 || 2569 || 6–7
|-
| 8 || align="left" | || 2570 || ½ || ½ || ½ || ½ || ½ || ½ || ½ ||  || ½ || ½ || ½ || 1 || ½ || 0 || 6½ || 2536 || 8–10
|-
| 9 || align="left" | || 2605 || ½ || ½ || 1 || 0 || ½ || 0 || ½ || ½ ||  || ½ || ½ || ½ || 1 || ½ || 6½ || 2533 || 8–10
|-
| 10 || align="left" | || 2545 || ½ || ½ || ½ || ½ || ½ || 0 || ½ || ½ || ½ ||  || 1 || ½ || ½ || ½ || 6½ || 2538 || 8–10
|-
| 11 || align="left" | || 2435 || 0 || ½ || 0 || ½ || 0 || ½ || ½ || ½ || ½ || 0 ||  || 0 || ½ || 1 || 4½ || 2437 || 11–13 
|- 
| 12 || align="left" | || 2470 || 0 || 0 || 0 || 0 || 0 || 1 || ½ || 0 || ½ || ½ || 1 ||  || ½ || ½ || 4½ || 2434 || 11–13
|-
| 13 || align="left" | || 2455 || 0 || 0 || ½ || 0 || ½ || 0 || ½ || ½ || 0 || ½ || ½ || ½ ||  || 1 || 4½ || 2435 || 11–13
|-
| 14 || align="left" | || 2520 || 0 || ½ || 0 || 0 || 0 || 0 || 0 || 1 || ½ || ½ || 0 || ½ || 0 ||  || 3 || 2329 || 14
|}

References

Tata Steel Chess Tournament
1986 in chess
1986 in Dutch sport